Sparganothis is a genus of moths belonging to the subfamily Tortricinae of the family Tortricidae.

Species

Sparganothis azulispecca Powell & Brown, 2012
Sparganothis bistriata Kearfott, 1907
Sparganothis boweri Powell & Brown, 2012
Sparganothis cana (Robinson, 1869)
Sparganothis caryae (Robinson, 1869)
Sparganothis chambersana (Kearfott, 1907)
Sparganothis daphnana McDunnough, 1961
Sparganothis demissana (Walsingham, 1879)
Sparganothis diluticostana (Walsingham, 1879)
Sparganothis directana (Walker, 1863)
Sparganothis distincta (Walsingham, 1884)
Sparganothis eulongicosta (Powell & Brown, 2012)
Sparganothis ferreana Busck, 1915
Sparganothis flavibasana (Fernald, 1882)
Sparganothis illustris Razowski, 1975
Sparganothis karacana (Kearfott, 1907)
Sparganothis lamberti Franclemont, 1986
Sparganothis lindalinea Powell & Brown, 2012
Sparganothis lycopodiana (Kearfott, 1907)
Sparganothis matsudai Yasuda, 1975
Sparganothis mcguinnessi Powell & Brown, 2012
Sparganothis mesospila (Zeller, 1875)
Sparganothis minimetallica Powell & Brown, 2012
Sparganothis niteolinea Powell & Brown, 2012
Sparganothis niveana (Walsingham, 1879)
Sparganothis pettitana (Robinson, 1869)
Sparganothis pilleriana ([Denis & Schiffermuller], 1775)
Sparganothis praecana (Kennel, 1900)
Sparganothis pulcherrimana (Walsingham, 1879)
Sparganothis reticulatana (Clemens, 1860)
Sparganothis richersi Powell & Brown, 2012
Sparganothis robinsonana Powell & Brown, 2012
Sparganothis rubicundana (Herrich-Schffer, 1856)
Sparganothis saracana (Kearfott, 1907)
Sparganothis senecionana (Walsingham, 1879)
Sparganothis striata (Walsingham, 1884)
Sparganothis sulfureana (Clemens, 1860)
Sparganothis sullivani Powell & Brown, 2012
Sparganothis taracana Kearfott, 1907
Sparganothis tessellata Powell & Brown, 2012
Sparganothis tristriata Kearfott, 1907
Sparganothis tunicana (Walsingham, 1879)
Sparganothis umbrana Barnes & Busck, 1920
Sparganothis unicolorana (Powell & Brown, 2012)
Sparganothis unifasciana (Clemens, 1864)
Sparganothis vabroui (Powell & Brown, 2012)
Sparganothis violaceana (Robinson, 1869)
Sparganothis vocaridorsana (Kearfott, 1905)
Sparganothis xanthoides (Walker, 1863)

Taxonomy
The genus Cenopis is either treated as a synonym Sparganothis, or a valid genus.

See also
 List of Tortricidae genera

References

External links
 tortricidae.com

 
Sparganothini
Tortricidae genera
Taxa named by Jacob Hübner